Abu Samah bin Borhan (born 27 February 1985) is a Malaysian wheelchair tennis player.

References

External links 
  
 

1985 births
Living people
Malaysian people of Malay descent
Malaysian Muslims
Malaysian male tennis players
Wheelchair tennis players
Wheelchair tennis players at the 2016 Summer Paralympics
Wheelchair tennis players at the 2020 Summer Paralympics
21st-century Malaysian people